Antoine Gakeme (born 24 December 1991) is a Burundian middle-distance runner who competes mainly in the 800 metres. He represented Burundi at the 2013 World Championships and was a finalist at the 2014 African Championships.

Career
Gakeme represented Burundi in the 800 metres at the 2013 World Championships; he set personal bests in both the heats (1:46.70) and semi-finals (1:45.39), but failed to qualify for the final. At the 2014 African Championships in Marrakech he placed seventh. In 2015, Gakeme won the 800 metres at the European Champion Clubs Cup, running a championship record 1:45.77; he was also part of Playas de Castellón's 4 × 400 metres relay team, which won in 3:07.92. Playas de Castellón won the club championship by two points.

Gakeme set his personal best (1:44.09) in Madrid in July 2015.

References

External links

1991 births
Living people
Burundian male middle-distance runners
World Athletics Championships athletes for Burundi
Athletes (track and field) at the 2016 Summer Olympics
Olympic athletes of Burundi
20th-century Burundian people
21st-century Burundian people